Replicon is a California-based software-as-a-service (SaaS) company that makes software for time tracking, advanced project management, task collaboration, resource allocation, and professional services automation. Replicon’s online timesheets and cloud clock are an alternative to paper timesheets or punch cards.

Products
Replicon's product suite focuses on time intelligence. 

Their suite of products include:
 Project Time Tracking
 Time & Resource Management
 Global Time & Attendance
 Project Expense Tracking
 Polaris – Professional Services Automation
 Polaris – Project Portfolio Management

Replicon has partnered and integrated with a number of HR, accounting, and payroll software. It also features an open API — allowing developers to integrate Replicon with their existing applications and software.

History
Replicon was co-founded in 1996  by Raj Narayanaswamy and Lakshmi Raj  in Calgary, Canada. The company expanded its presence globally over the years and has set up major offices in other countries. The founders reckoned that simple everyday processes like time sheet management and expense reports cause major problems and hence went about building web-based applications to relieve the stress on businesses and optimize workforce productivity.
As of March 2022, Replicon reportedly has over 7800 B2B customers in 70 countries, and has more than 600 employees across Australia, Canada, India, the United Kingdom, and the United States. The company remains privately owned.

Selected awards and recognition
 Replicon ranked in Top 250 Canadian Tech Companies for 2008
 Replicon ranked as one of the fastest growing Canadian tech companies in 2004 and 2005 in Deloitte Technology Fast 50
 Replicon ranked in Software Magazine's Annual 500 Ranking in 2004, 2005, 2006 and 2007

See also
 Comparison of time tracking software
 Project management software
 Time tracking software

References

Time-tracking software
Web applications
Business software
Business software companies
Software companies established in 1996